Presbyterian Orphans Home, now known as Presbyterian Homes & Family Services, is a historic "cottage style" orphanage complex located at Lynchburg, Virginia.  It consists of six residence halls, a superintendent's house, and an executive building, all constructed of brick in the Georgian Revival style.  Also on the property is a Greek Revival style gymnasium.  Other contributing buildings and structures include the maintenance building, swimming pool, two farmhouses, dairy barn, stable, barn, and entry gates.  A contributing site is the campus circle. 

On 26 October 1909, five children housed in the nursery were killed in a fire. Shelton Cottage, a two-story building, was completely destroyed. Newspaper reports from the time call the institution the "Virginia Synod Presbyterian Orphans' Home."

The original buildings were constructed in 1911.

It was listed on the National Register of Historic Places in 2010.

Gallery

References

External links
 Presbyterian Homes & Family Services website

Residential buildings on the National Register of Historic Places in Virginia
Georgian Revival architecture in Virginia
Greek Revival architecture in Virginia
Buildings and structures completed in 1911
Buildings and structures in Lynchburg, Virginia
National Register of Historic Places in Lynchburg, Virginia